The 2019–20 East Tennessee State Buccaneers men's basketball team represented East Tennessee State University in the 2019–20 NCAA Division I men's basketball season. The Buccaneers, led by fifth-year head coach Steve Forbes, played their home games at the Freedom Hall Civic Center in Johnson City, Tennessee, as members of the Southern Conference. They finished the season 30–4, 16–2 in SoCon play to finish as the SoCon regular season champions. They defeated VMI, Western Carolina and Wofford to become champions of the SoCon tournament. They earned the SoCon's automatic bid to the NCAA tournament. However, the NCAA Tournament was cancelled amid the COVID-19 pandemic.

On April 30, 2020, head coach Steve Forbes resigned to become the head coach at Wake Forest. He finished at ETSU with a five-year record of 130–43.

Previous season
The Buccaneers finished the 2018–19 season 24–10 overall, 13–5 in SoCon play to finish in a tie for third place. In the SoCon tournament, they defeated Chattanooga in the quarterfinals, before losing to Wofford in the semifinals. They received an invitation to the CIT, where they lost to Green Bay in the first round.

Roster

Schedule and results

|-
!colspan=12 style=| Exhibition

|-
!colspan=12 style=| Regular season

|-
!colspan=12 style=| SoCon tournament
|-

|-
!colspan=9 style=| NCAA tournament

Source

References

East Tennessee State Buccaneers men's basketball seasons
East Tennessee State
East Tennessee State Buccaneers men's basketball
East Tennessee State Buccaneers men's basketball